Mountain figwort is a common name for several plants and may refer to:

Scrophularia desertorum
Scrophularia lanceolata